Sóc Sơn is a district (huyện) of Hanoi, the capital city of Vietnam. Nội Bài International Airport is located in this district.

Sóc Sơn district is bordered by the provinces of Bắc Giang and Bắc Ninh to the east, Vĩnh Phúc province to the west, Mê Linh district to the southwest, Đông Anh district to the south and Thái Nguyên province to the north.

The district is subdivided to 26 commune-level subdivisions, including the township of Sóc Sơn (district capital) and the rural communes of Bắc Phú, Bắc Sơn, Đông Xuân, Đức Hòa, Hiền Ninh, Hồng Kỳ, Kim Lũ, Mai Đình, Minh Phú, Minh Trí, Nam Sơn, Phú Cường, Phù Linh, Phù Lỗ, Phú Minh, Quang Tiến, Tân Dân, Tân Hưng, Tân Minh, Thanh Xuân, Tiên Dược, Trung Giã, Việt Long, Xuân Giang, Xuân Thu.

Landmarks
The district is home to the Sóc Sơn temple, a temple notably celebrated as a stopping point in the Gióng Festival.

References

Districts of Hanoi